Madison Comprehensive High School is a public high school in Madison Township, near Mansfield, Ohio, United States. It is the only high school in the Madison Local School District.  Athletic teams are known as the Rams and the school colors are green and white.

State championships
 Girls Volleyball – 1997
 Girls Soccer - 2020

Notable alumni
 Justin Edwards - Professional mixed martial artist for the Ultimate Fighting Championship (UFC) Lightweight Division
 Lee Owens - College football head coach

 Ryan Pore professional soccer player

External links

References

High schools in Richland County, Ohio
Public high schools in Ohio